Syeda Asifa Ashrafi Papia is a Bangladesh Nationalist Party politician and the former Member of Parliament from a reserved seat. Her husband, Harunur Rashid, is a Member of Parliament.

Early life 
Syeda Asifa Ashrafi Papia was born on 1 March 1967 in Nilphamari District. His father's ancestral home was in Gopalpur, Lalpur upazila of Natore.

Career
Papia was elected to parliament from reserved seat as a Bangladesh Nationalist Party candidate in 2009. She served as the General Secretary of Chapainawabganj District unit of Bangladesh Nationalist Party. On 16 June 2015, she was arrested on arson charges by Bangladesh Police.

References

Living people
1967 births
Bangladesh Nationalist Party politicians
University of Rajshahi alumni
Women members of the Jatiya Sangsad
9th Jatiya Sangsad members
21st-century Bangladeshi women politicians
21st-century Bangladeshi politicians